Zhabei Stadium is a multi-use stadium in Shanghai.  It is currently used mostly for football matches and athletics events.  The stadium has a capacity of 20,000 people with 16,000 seats and about 4,000 people in all standing place.

Footnotes

Sports venues in Shanghai
Football venues in Shanghai